Seven Keys to Baldpate is a 1913 novel by Earl Derr Biggers. A bestseller, it was adapted by George M. Cohan into a play, which in turn was adapted several times for film, radio and TV.

The plot of the novel differs from the play in many respects.

The setting was based on the real Baldpate Mountain. An American hotel inspired by that name, The Baldpate Inn, opened in 1918.

Adaptations
The play adapted by George M. Cohan in 1913 was subsequently filmed and broadcast on radio and TV several times:
 Seven Keys to Baldpate (1916 film), from Australia
 Seven Keys to Baldpate (1917 film) starring Cohan himself
 Seven Keys to Baldpate (1925 film) with Douglas MacLean
 Seven Keys to Baldpate (1929 film) with Richard Dix
 Seven Keys to Baldpate (1935 film) with Gene Raymond
 Seven Keys to Baldpate (1947 film) with Phillip Terry
 House of the Long Shadows (1983)

Radio adaptations: 
 1938 for Lux Radio Theatre with Jack Benny
 1946 for Theatre Guild on the Air with Walter Pidgeon

Theatre Adaptation
Victoria Theatre, Singapore, 1946.
Kenneth Williams stage début.

Television 
Adaptations were made in 1946 and 1961.

References

External links

Complete novel at Internet Archive
 

 Novel
1913 American novels
American novels adapted into films
Novels by Earl Derr Biggers
Bobbs-Merrill Company books